The 2017 Rugby League World Cup qualifying process began on 9 May 2015 with the 2015 European Championship C. In August 2014, it was announced that seven of the eight quarter-finalists at the 2013 tournament would receive automatic qualification. Fourteen teams took part in the qualifying process to fill the remaining seven spots.

Background
Eight teams automatically qualified for the World Cup. Seven of the teams which reached the quarter-finals of the 2013 World Cup were granted automatic qualification, along with co-hosts Papua New Guinea. The eighth quarter-finalist, the United States, were denied automatic qualification due to an internal governance dispute and instead forced to enter the qualification process.

Qualified teams

Americas

One team qualified from this region. A three-team round robin tournament was held in Florida in December 2015 to determine the qualifier.

Asia-Pacific

Two additional qualifying places were initially allocated to this region. Papua New Guinea were granted automatic qualification in 2015 after being confirmed as co-hosts, leaving one additional team to qualify from this region. A single play-off between Tonga and Cook Islands determined the final qualifier.

Europe
Three additional teams qualified from this region. A two-group, round-robin tournament took place in October 2016 to determine the qualifying nations - this was contested by the winners of the 2015 European Championship C tournament, the top three teams from the 2014–15 European Championship B tournament, and seeded nations Wales and Ireland.

First round

Second round

Third round

The tournament featured two groups of three teams playing in a single round-robin format. The winners of each group qualified for the World Cup, while the runners-up faced each other in a play-off match on 5 November 2016 to determine the final spot. A seeded draw took place to determine the groups on 5 November 2015.

Group A

Group B

Fourth round

Middle East-Africa

One team qualified from this region. A two match series was held between South Africa and Lebanon to determine the qualifier.

References 

Qualifying, 2017 Rugby League World Cup
2015 in rugby league
2016 in rugby league